History & Memory is a double-blind peer-reviewed academic journal covering the study of historical consciousness and collective memory. Scott Ury (Tel Aviv University) is the current editor of History & Memory. The journal's previous editors include Saul Friedländer, Dan Diner and Gulie Ne’eman Arad (1989-2000), Gadi Algazi (2001-2012) and José Brunner (2012-2020).

Published biannually by Indiana University Press, History & Memory currently has an H-Index of 23.

Further reading

 Edele, Mark. "Fighting Russia's History Wars: Vladimir Putin and the Codification of World War II." History and Memory 29.2 (2016): 90–124.
 Funkenstein, Amos. "Collective Memory and Historical Consciousness." History and Memory 1.1 (1989): 5-26.
 He, Yinan. "Remembering and Forgetting the War: Elite Mythmaking, Mass Reaction, and Sino-Japanese Relations, 1950–2006." History and Memory 19.2 (2007): 43–74.
 Hutton, Patrick. "Recent scholarship on memory and history." The History Teacher 33.4 (2000): 533–548.
 Laub, Dori. "On Holocaust Testimony and Its “Reception” within Its Own Frame, as a Process in Its Own Right: A Response to “Between History and Psychoanalysis” by Thomas Trezise." History and Memory 21/1 (2009): 127–150.
 Levey, Cara. "Of HIJOS and Niños: Revisiting Postmemory in Post-Dictatorship Uruguay." History and Memory 26.2 (2014): 5-39.
 Lowenthal, David. "Fabricating Heritage." History and Memory 10.1 (1998): 5-24. 
 Maier, Charles S. "A Surfeit of Memory? Reflections on History, Melancholy and Denial." History and Memory 5.2 (1993): 136–152.
 Mann, Barbara E. "“An Apartment to Remember”: Palestinian Memory in the Israeli Landscape." History and Memory 27.1 (2015): 83–115.
 McGregor, Katharine and Mackie, Vera. "Transcultural Memory and the Troostmeisjes/Comfort Women Photographic Project." History and Memory 30.1 (2018): 116–150.
 Myers, David N. and Funkenstein, Amos. "Remembering "Zakhor": A Super-Commentary [with Response]." History and Memory 4.2 (1992): 129–148.
 Perry, Rachel E. "Holocaust Hospitality: Michal Rovner's Living Landscape at Yad Vashem." History and Memory 28.2 (2016): 89–122.
 Podeh, Eli. "History and Memory in the Israeli Educational System: The Portrayal of the Arab-Israeli Conflict in History Textbooks (1948-2000)." History and Memory 12:1 (2000): 65–100. 
 Schramm, Katharina. "Introduction: Landscapes of Violence: Memory and Sacred Space." History and Memory 23.1 (2011): 5-22. 
 Trezise, Thomas. "Between History and Psychoanalysis: A Case Study in the Reception of Holocaust Survivor Testimony." History and Memory 20.1 (2008): 7-47.
 Wagner, Sarah and Matyók, Thomas. "Monumental Change: The Shifting Politics of Obligation at the Tomb of the Unknowns." History and Memory 30.1 (2018): 40–75.

External links 
 
History & Memory at JSTOR
History & Memory at Project MUSE

Biannual journals
English-language journals
Publications established in 1989
History journals
Indiana University Press academic journals